Mahendra Ratwatte was a Sri Lankan politician and former Mayor of Kandy, from 2011 to 2015. He is the current Basnayake Nilame of Sri Maha Vishnu Devalaya of Kandy & Dedi Munda Devalaya of Aluthnuwara.

Early life
He is the second son of General Anuruddha Ratwatte & Carman Rangala Ratwatte, Mahendra Ratwatte's father was ex acting Diyawadana Nilame and former Cabinet Minister. His grandfather Harris Leuke Ratwatte who was former Diyawadana Nilame of Sri Dalada Maligawa, Kandy.

Politics
Ratwatte entered active politics from Sri Lanka Freedom Party in 2011 and was elected to the Kandy Municipal Council and served as the Mayor of Kandy, from 2011 to 2015.

See also
List of political families in Sri Lanka

References

External links
 Ratwatte Family Tree

Living people
Sri Lankan Buddhists
Politicians from Kandy
Sri Lanka Freedom Party politicians
United People's Freedom Alliance politicians
Mayors of Kandy
Mahendra
Sinhalese politicians
Year of birth missing (living people)